The Vale of Glamorgan county borough is a rural and agricultural area of south Wales. With 110 scheduled monuments, evenly spread across the borough, it is an area with a high density of such sites. Forty-one sites date to prehistoric times, including three neolithic tombs, eighteen round barrows and sixteen Iron Age hill forts. The four Roman sites include two Roman Villas, and there are seven pre-Norman medieval sites, mainly chapels and crosses. It is the 52 medieval monuments that provide some of the most visible remains. There are seven castles and a further eighteen defensive locations. There are also eight religious sites, including crosses, a chantry and a priory. Unusually, four of the six post-medieval sites are 20th-century structures, being World War II defences. All of the Vale of Glamorgan administrative area lies within the historic county of Glamorgan.

Scheduled monuments have statutory protection. The compilation of the list is undertaken by Cadw Welsh Historic Monuments, which is an executive agency of the National Assembly of Wales. The list of scheduled monuments below is supplied by Cadw with additional material from RCAHMW and Glamorgan-Gwent Archaeological Trust.

Scheduled monuments in the Vale of Glamorgan

See also
List of Cadw properties
List of castles in Wales
List of hill forts in Wales
Historic houses in Wales
List of monastic houses in Wales
List of museums in Wales
List of Roman villas in Wales

References
Coflein is the online database of RCAHMW: Royal Commission on the Ancient and Historical Monuments of Wales, GGAT is the Glamorgan-Gwent Archaeological Trust, Cadw is the Welsh Historic Monuments Agency

Vale of Glamorgan
Buildings and structures in the Vale of Glamorgan
Monuments and memorials in the Vale of Glamorgan